Hamid Khozouie Abyane (born 1963) is an Iranian cinematographer. He is one of the most decorated cinematographers in contemporary Iranian cinema, winning multiple Simorgh awards for his work.

Films
2019 - Gholamreza Takhti
2017 - Simulation
2014 – BIGANEH
2011 – YE HABE GHAND
2011 – INJA BEDOONE MAN
2010 – PARSE DAR MEH
2010 – MOLKE SOLEIMAN
2007 – PA BERAHNE DAR BEHESHT
2005 – KHEILI DOUR, KHEILI NAZDIK
2005 – KHABGAH-E DOKHTARAN
2004 – MARMOULAK
2002 – PARANDEH BAZ-E KOUCHAK
2002 – INJA CHERAGHI ROSHAN AST (Here, a Shining Light; Crystal Simorgh Award at the Fajr International Film Festival
2001 – ZIR-E NOOR-E MAAH (Under the Moonlight; Fajr International Film Festival)
2000 – KOUDAK VA SARBAZ (The Child and the Soldier; Three Continents Festival in Nantes)

References

Iranian cinematographers
1963 births
Living people
People from Tehran